Speak of the devil is an English idiom.

Speak of the Devil may also refer to:
 Speak of the Devil (Ozzy Osbourne album), a 1982 live album
Speak of the Devil (1989 film), a movie directed by Raphael Nussbaum
 Speak of the Devil (John Abercrombie album), 1993
 Speak of the Devil (Chris Isaak album), 1998
 Speak of the Devil (book), a 1998 investigation of allegations of satanic ritual abuse in England by anthropologist Jean LaFontaine
Speak of the Devil: The Canon of Anton LaVey, a 1993 documentary film directed by Nick Bougas about Church of Satan founder Anton LaVey
"Speak of the Devil" (song), 1991 country song recorded by Pirates of the Mississippi
"Speak of the Devil" (Under the Dome), 
"Speak of the Devil", a season one episode of Daredevil
Speak of the Devil, a collegiate a cappella group at Duke University

See also
Talk of the devil (disambiguation)